Bremerhaven Airport ( or Bremerhaven-Luneort)  was a regional airfield in Luneort, a district of Bremerhaven, Germany, 7.6 km (4.7 mi) from the city center. It was mainly used for general aviation and leisure flying activities. The airfield closed on 29 February 2016 and in preparation for demolition, as a new freight seaport will be built on its site. It was replaced by the new Sea-Airport Cuxhaven/Nordholz at the jointly used Nordholz Naval Airbase.

Airlines and destinations
Effective the evening of 21 February 2016, there are no regular passenger flights.

See also
 Transport in Germany
 List of airports in Germany

References

External links

Official website

Airports in Bremen (state)
Defunct airports in Germany